Nancy M. Bonini (born 1959) is an American neuroscientist and geneticist, best known for pioneering the use of Drosophila as a model organism to study neurodegeneration of the human brain. Using the Drosophila model approach, Bonini's laboratory has identified genes and pathways that are important in the development and progression of neurodegenerative diseases such as Amyotrophic lateral sclerosis (ALS, also called Lou Gehrig's Disease),  Alzheimer's disease, and Parkinson's disease,  as well as aging, neural injury and regeneration, and response to environmental toxins.

A professor of biology at the University of Pennsylvania since 1994, Bonini has held appointments as the inaugural Lucille B. Williams Term Professor of Biology (2006–2012), an Investigator of the Howard Hughes Medical Institute (2000–2013), and the Florence RC Murray Professor of Biology (since 2012).  She was editor of the Annual Review of Genetics from 2018-2021.

Early life and education
Bonini was born in 1959 to parents Rose and William “Bill” Bonini. Her father was a Professor of GeoScience and Civil Engineering at Princeton University from 1952 to 1996. Nancy, her sister (Jennifer), brothers (Jack and Jamie), and father all attended Princeton University.

Bonini earned an AB degree from Princeton University in 1981, studying Biology. Her undergraduate thesis research, performed under the direction of William (Chip) Quinn, formed the basis for her first publication, "Reward Learning in Normal and Mutant Drosophila". After graduation,  Bonini entered the Neurosciences Training Program at the University of Wisconsin–Madison. There, she completed doctoral research in the laboratory of David L. Nelson,  graduating with a Doctorate (Ph.D.) in Neuroscience in 1987. Bonini's post-doctoral research was performed in the laboratory of Seymour Benzer (behavioral geneticist) at the California Institute of Technology. Focusing on using the fruit fly as a tool for understanding the genetic basis of the brain and behavior, Bonini was the first to demonstrate that Drosophila can be used as a model of human neurodegenerative disease.

Research

The fruit fly as a model for human neurodegenerative disease
In 1998, Bonini's research conclusively demonstrated that Drosophila could be used as an in vivo model for human neurodegenerative disease. Using this model, Bonini's research group subsequently discovered unexpected and novel pathways that play a role in normal biology, injury, and disease. In the pioneering study that showed that the fruit fly can be used as a model of disease, Bonini's laboratory collaborated with human geneticists to examine the effects of expressing normal and mutant forms of a human neurodegenerative polyQ disease protein. Flies that expressed the mutant form of the protein showed symptoms and characteristics similar to those seen in human polyQ disease patients; flies that expressed the normal protein did not.

Chaperones and Polyglutamine Repeat Diseases
Studying Polyglutamine repeat diseases (polyQ diseases) in Drosophila neurodegeneration models, Bonini's research group elucidated an important role for molecular chaperones in polyQ diseases, and subsequently Parkinson's disease. In those studies, upregulation of the chaperone Hsp70 suppressed neurodegeneration, and this finding established chaperones as a new therapeutic target for Parkinson's disease and other neurodegenerative disorders. Bonini's research team demonstrated the pharmacologic potential of chaperones in further Drosophila studies; administering geldanamycin (an antitumor antibiotic that acts on Hsp90) to mutant flies before symptoms of neural decline were visible averted the onset of neurodegeneration in the mutant flies, suggesting a new approach for people susceptible to Parkinson's disease and other neurodegenerative conditions.

Amyotrophic lateral sclerosis (ALS/Lou Gehrig's Disease)
Bonini's research laboratory developed and validated a Drosophila model for familial ALS, then used an ALS model to evaluate genes and pathways important for ALS onset, progression, and possible treatment. Through these studies, Bonini's team, in collaboration with Aaron Gitler, discovered that ATXN2 (the gene that encodes the protein Ataxin-2) was a disease susceptibility gene for ALS, and that interrupting the interaction between TDP-43 and Ataxin-2 was a promising target for treating ALS and other diseases.

A role for brain microRNAs in aging and disease
The Bonini lab discovered that a conserved microRNA, miR-34, plays a neuroprotective role in the brains of aging Drosophila. The loss of miR-34 resulted in a profile consistent with accelerated aging, late-onset brain neurodegeneration, and reduced survival, whereas upregulation of miR-34 enhanced survival and mitigated neurodegeneration.

An epigenetic basis for Alzheimer's disease
In 2018, Bonini, with collaborators Shelley Berger, Brad Johnson, and others, completed a study investigating the epigenetic landscape of tissue samples donated by individuals who did and did not have Alzheimer's disease. The findings established the basis for an epigenetic link between aging and Alzheimer's disease, suggesting a new model for the disease and a paradigm shift from the previously established view of Alzheimer's disease as an 'advanced state of normal aging'. Based on the study findings, Bonini and collaborators established that a set of normal aging changes that occur in the epigenome protect against Alzheimer's disease, and that disrupting those normal protective changes may be a trigger that predisposes people to the disease.

Honors and awards
A professor of biology at the University of Pennsylvania since 1994, Bonini has held appointments as the inaugural Lucille B. Williams Term Professor of Biology (2006–2012), an Investigator of the Howard Hughes Medical Institute (2000–2013), and the Florence RC Murray Professor of Biology (2012-). In 2012, she was elected to the National Academy of Sciences, and the National Academy of Medicine. Also in 2012, Bonini became an elected Fellow of the American Association for the Advancement of Science. In 2014, Bonini was elected to the American Academy of Arts and Sciences.

Bonini was the recipient of a March of Dimes Basil O'Connor Award in 1996, a Packard Fellowship for Science and Engineering in 1997, an Ellison Medical Foundation Senior Scholar in Aging Research Award in 2009, a Glenn Award for Research in the Biological Mechanisms of Aging in 2015, and a National Institutes of Health Outstanding Investigator R35 Award in 2016. In 2010, she appeared as a panelist on Charlie Rose’s The Brain Series (Episode: The Disordered Brain).

Personal

Bonini is married to Anthony Cashmore, a University of Pennsylvania Professor Emeritus best known for discovering the cryptochrome that serves as a blue light photoreceptor in Arabidopsis.

Representative publications

Journal articles
 Warrick JM, Paulson HL, Gray-Board GL, Bui QT, Fischbeck KH, Pittman RN, Bonini NM (1998) Expanded Polyglutamine Protein Forms Nuclear Inclusions and Causes Neural Degeneration in Drosophila. Cell 93(6): 939–949. .
 Warrick JM, Chan HY, Gray-Board GL, Paulson H, Bonini NM (1999) Suppression of polyglutamine disease in Drosophila by the molecular chaperone hsp70.  Nature Genetics 23: 425–428. .
 Auluck PK, Chan HY, Trojanowski JQ, Lee VM, Bonini NM (2002) Chaperone suppression of alpha-synuclein toxicity in a Drosophila model for Parkinson's disease. Science 295(5556):865-8. 
 Watson MR, Lagow RD, Xu K, Zhang B, Bonini NM (2008) A Drosophila Model for Amyotrophic Lateral Sclerosis Reveals Motor Neuron Damage by Human SOD1. Journal of Biological Chemistry 283:24972-24981. . (highlighted as paper of the week)
 Kim HJ, Raphael AR, LaDow ES, McGurk L, Weber RA, Trojanowski JQ, Lee VM, Finkbeiner S, Gitler AD, Bonini NM (2014) Therapeutic modulation of eIF2α phosphorylation rescues TDP-43 toxicity in amyotrophic lateral sclerosis disease models.  Nature Genetics 46:152-160. .
 Nativio R, Donahue G, Berson A, Lan Y, Amlie-Wolf A, Tuzer F, Toledo JB, Gosai SJ, Gregory BD, Torres C, Trojanowski JQ, Wang LS, Johnson FB, Bonini NM, Berger SL (2018) Dysregulation of the epigenetic landscape of normal aging in Alzheimer's disease.  Nature Neuroscience  21: 497–505. .

Reviews
 McGurk L, Berson A, Bonini NM (2015) Drosophila as an in vivo model for human neurodegenerative disease. Genetics 201: 377–402. .
 Fang Y, Bonini NM (2015) Hope on the (fruit) fly—the Drosophila wing paradigm of axon injury. Neural Regeneration Research 10: 173–5. . 
 McGurk L, Rifai O, Bonini NM (2019) Poly(ADP-ribosylation) in age-related neurological disease. Trends in Genetics 35: 601–613. .

Commentary
 Bonini NM, Hardiman O (2015) Ataxin-2 expands insight into the ALS clinical spectrum. Neurology 84: 244–5. .
 Bonini NM, Berger SL (2017) The Sustained Impact of Model Organisms–in Genetics & Epigenetics. Genetics 205:1-4. .

References

External links
 Official website-The Bonini Lab
 

American neuroscientists
American women neuroscientists
American women biologists
American women geneticists
American biologists
American geneticists
Howard Hughes Medical Investigators
Fellows of the American Academy of Arts and Sciences
Fellows of the American Association for the Advancement of Science
Princeton University alumni
University of Wisconsin–Madison alumni
1959 births
Living people
University of Pennsylvania faculty
University of Pennsylvania Department of Biology faculty
Members of the United States National Academy of Sciences
American women academics
Annual Reviews (publisher) editors
21st-century American women
Members of the National Academy of Medicine